Kentucky Fight is a fight song at the University of Kentucky. It is a fairly traditional-sounding march, and the lyrics are almost never sung. The song has three verses: one is generic, one is for football, and one is for basketball.

Lyrics 
Normal Verse:

Basketball Verse:

Football verse:

Normal verse:

References

External links
Song recording

Kentucky Wildcats
American college songs
College fight songs in the United States
Southeastern Conference fight songs
Year of song missing
Song articles with missing songwriters